Vambu Sandai is a 2008 Indian Tamil-language film starring Uday Kiran, Sathyaraj, and Diya.  The film was partially reshot in Telugu as Lakshmi Putrudu  (translation: Lakshmi's Son).

Plot
Prabhakaran alias Prabhu (Uday Kiran) is a college student who does not allow anyone to do wrong. He quite often argues with others to the point where he is repeatedly arrested. When he was younger his foster father, Nehru (Livingston), a psychiatrist used to bail him out. In the meantime, Swetha (Diya), the sister of the commissioner of police Ravichandran, has been ditching her college classes, so her father has a police escort take her to school. When she tries to escape from her escort, they pursue her. They cross paths with the troublesome Prabhu, who battles them. In the ensuing fight, Prabhu says 'I love you' to Swetha and she is so impressed by his gallantry, she falls in love.

Prabhu then learns that his foster parents are taking him to meet his real father, Jeevanandham  (Satyaraj), who had been receiving treatment in a mental hospital. He tries to speak with his father, but the man is unresponsive. On the advice of Swetha's father, he takes his father to Kerala for treatment. When there, he meets a former bodyguard of Jeevanandham  who tells him that not only was his father the former Election Commissioner, but that his current mental breakdown state was caused by local politician Dharmalingam (Vijayan). Coincidentally, Dharmalingam has been brought to that same Kerala facility by his own son, Narayanan (Riyaz Khan). When Dharmalingam's  son learns that his father's former enemy Jeevanandham is still alive, he attempts to kill him.

Cast

 Uday Kiran as Prabhakaran "Prabhu"
 Diya as Swetha
 Sathyaraj as Jeevanandham (Prabhu's father)
 Nizhalgal Ravi as Prabhakaran's foster father
 Ramesh Khanna
 Livingston as Nehru
 Sabitha Anand as Lakshmi, Prabhakaran's mother
 Raj Kapoor as Ravichandran
 Vijayan as Dharmalingam
 Riyaz Khan as Narayanan
 Sanjay AV
 Manobala
 Sukumari as  Jeevanandham's mother
 Ilavarasu
 Rajan P Dev as Malayali doctor
 Shakeela
 Mumaith Khan as an item number (Telugu version)

Production
Filming began in July 2007, and scenes were shot at Pragati Resorts, Ramoji Film City, Necklace Road, Malaysia Township, and Golconda Fort, and ran through August 2007 in other areas around Hyderabad and Kerala, with a then-predicted release date of September 2007. However, by the end of September, the film was still in post-production.

Music release
Although the film was not released until 29 February 2008, the CD of the song tracks for the Telugu version from the film was released 2 September 2007, which preceded the film's release by 5 months. In a pre-release event for Telugu version titled Lakshmi Putrudu held at Ravi Narayana Reddy Kalyanamantapam (Ravi Narayana Reddy Memorial Auditorium Complex) in Hyderabad, Damodar Reddy, the Andhra Pradesh State Minister for Information Technology, officially launched the audio cassette by handing a copy to Tammareddy Bharadwaja and with its first number dedicated to producer Ashok Kumar. Bharadwaja then officially released the audio CDs by giving a copy to A. Mallikarjuna Rao, producer of Operation Duryodhana, a biopic film based upon the 2005 sting operation of the same name. Distribution rights to the audio CD for the Telugu version were purchased by Srinivas, a State Trading corporation chairman and former legislator.

Soundtrack
The soundtrack was composed by D. Imman. The audio was released on 23 August 2007 with  Silambarasan attending as a chief guest.

Tamil Soundtrack

Telugu Soundtrack

Reception
The film opened to mixed reviews. Kollywood Today wrote that "If Director Raj Kapoor had concentrated bit on the part of screenplay and presented it in a gripping manner, then things would have been more greater for him. Vambu Sandai is a movie to watch if you need to spend your leisure time…". BizHat wrote that "Director Rajkapoor looks still a novice and has to work hard to make his mark as a director. 'Vambu Sandai' is just passable fare". The film took an average opening at the box office. Reviewing the Telugu version, Lakshmi Putrudu, Full Hyderabad gave the film's rating 1 out of 5 and wrote "Uday Kiran acts the best in the film, and guess that says more about how the others act. There are a few deep lines in the movie, but they are so few that it is not worth wasting (as spending is a word that can't be used in this context) your money, time, or energy, on this film."

References

External links
 

2008 drama films
2008 films
2000s Tamil-language films
Indian multilingual films
Indian drama films
Films directed by Raj Kapoor (Tamil film director)